Policeman (translit. Ha-shoter) is a 2011 Israeli drama film directed by Nadav Lapid. Policeman won multiple awards at the 2011 Jerusalem Film Festival.

Plot
Klein plays Yaron the head of a counter terrorist organization. There is a hostage drama near the end of the film. Yaron's wife is pregnant. The film explores Yaron's difficulties in compartmentalizing his professional and domestic lives.

Cast
 Tracy Abramovich
 Ben Adam as Yotam
 Michael Aloni as Nathanael
 Roy Arad
 Meital Barda as Nili
 Lior Raz
 Ariel Barone
 Noam Boker
 Moris Cohen
 David Dector
 Miri Fabian
 Shlomi Hayun
 Gal Hoyberger as Ariel
 Ady Jakubovitz
 Yiftach Klein as Yaron
 Yaara Pelzig as Shira
 Rona-Lee Shimon as Hila

References

External links
 

2011 films
2010s police films
2011 drama films
Israeli drama films
2010s Hebrew-language films
Films directed by Nadav Lapid